Mirificin, also known as daidzein 8-C-(6-apiofuranosylglucoside), is an isoflavone that is found in Pueraria mirifica and Pueraria lobata. It has estrogenic activity and hence is a phytoestrogen.

See also
 Daidzein
 Deoxymiroestrol
 Miroestrol
 Puerarin
3'-Methoxymirificin

References

Flavone glycosides
Isoflavones
Phytoestrogens